Helochar Pam (Assamese: হেলচাৰ পাম) or Helocha or Helacha is a village in Sarthebari Circle of Barpeta district in the state of Assam, India. It is located on the banks of the Kaldia River. Nearby main Bazaar is Bhaktardoba.

Education 
 578 No. Helechia L.P.S
Helocha Girls ME School
Helocha Nalir Pam ME Madrassa

References 

Villages in Barpeta district